Rietmolen is a village in the eastern Netherlands. It is located in the municipality of Berkelland, Gelderland.

It was first mentioned in the 1630s as Rytmuelerbrugh, and means "windmill along a stream". Since 1712, the inn Reetmölle was used as a Catholic church. In 1835, a real church was built. In 1931, construction began on a new church.

Gallery

References 

Populated places in Gelderland
Berkelland